Helene "Leni" Thurner (born 12 August 1938 in Zams) is an Austrian luger who competed during the 1960s. She won the bronze medal in the women's singles event at the 1964 Winter Olympics in Innsbruck. She also competed at the 1968 Winter Olympics.

Thurner also won three medals in the women's singles event at the FIL World Luge Championships with a silver (1963) and two bronzes (1961, 1967).

She also won a silver medal in the women's singles at the 1962 FIL European Luge Championships in Weissenbach, Austria.

References

External links

 
 

1938 births
Living people
Austrian female lugers
Olympic lugers of Austria
Olympic bronze medalists for Austria
Lugers at the 1964 Winter Olympics
Lugers at the 1968 Winter Olympics
Olympic medalists in luge
Medalists at the 1964 Winter Olympics
20th-century Austrian women
21st-century Austrian women